Nandrolone nonanoate, also known as nandrolone pelargonate or as 19-nortestosterone 17β-nonanoate, is an androgen and anabolic steroid and an androgen ester—specifically, the C17β nonanoate (pelargonate) ester of nandrolone (19-nortestosterone)—which was studied but was never marketed.

References

Abandoned drugs
Alkene derivatives
Androgens and anabolic steroids
Enones
Nonanoate esters
Nandrolone esters
Prodrugs
Progestogens